The Indonesian national ice hockey team is the national men's ice hockey team of Indonesia and has been an associate member of the International Ice Hockey Federation (IIHF). Indonesia is currently not ranked in the IIHF World Ranking and have not entered in any World Championship tournaments or at any Olympic Games, but have played in the Challenge Cup of Asia, a regional tournament for lower-tier hockey nations in Asia.

History
The national team's first ever ice hockey match was a 10–0 loss on 19 January 2017, to Jakarta Dragons at the Bintaro Jaya Xchange Ice Skating Rink in Bintaro, Tangerang. Many of the Indonesian national team's players that partook in the match came from the Batavia Demons, a team that won the 2016 City Cup international ice hockey tournament (B Division invitational with some import player from Taiwan) which was held in Singapore.

Indonesia made its debut in the international tournament at the 2017 Asian Winter Games in Sapporo, Japan. Their first tournament match was supposed to be against Iran, but their opposition was disqualified due to eligibility issues. Iran still played their scheduled match against Indonesia on 17 February 2017, resulting a 10–3 win for the former. However, the game was considered as an exhibition game and its results had no bearing in the standings of the tournament. Indonesia later lost 13–2 to Malaysia in their first Asian Winter Games.

Indonesia made its debut in ice hockey tournament at the 2017 Southeast Asian Games. Finished last place after losing all four games.

Tournament record

Asian Winter Games

Challenge Cup of Asia

Southeast Asian Games

All-time record against other nations
Last match update: 6 December 2019

Note: Iran was disqualified from the 2017 Asian Winter Games due to a number of players were deemed ineligible in the regional games.

References

External links
Official website of the Federasi Hoki Es Indonesia
IIHF profile

National
National ice hockey teams in Asia
Ice hockey